The Pro-Design Pro-Ject is an Austrian single-place paraglider that was designed and produced by Pro-Design of Natters in the mid-2000s. It is now out of production.

Design and development
The aircraft was designed as an advanced and cross country glider.

The models are each named for their relative size.

Variants
Pro-Ject M
Mid-sized model for medium-weight pilots. The glider model is DHV 2-3 certified.
Pro-Ject L
Large-sized model for heavier pilots. The glider model is DHV 2-3 certified.

Specifications (Pro-Ject M)

References

Pro-Ject
Paragliders
2000s Austrian aircraft